Emergency Call is an American unscripted television series which airs on ABC. It is an adaptation of an original Belgian format. ABC picked up the series in 2020 for an initial cycle of ten episodes, with Luke Wilson as host; the series premiered on September 28, 2020.

The first season features the work of 9-1-1 dispatchers in Austin, Texas; New Orleans, Louisiana; Waukesha, Wisconsin; Wasilla, Alaska; and Ogden, Utah.

Episodes

Reception

References

External links

2020s American reality television series
2020 American television series debuts
2021 American television series endings
American non-fiction television series
American Broadcasting Company original programming
Emergency communication
English-language television shows
American television series based on Belgian television series